Tsvetlin Yovchev is a Bulgarian politician, who served in the security sector as a head of the DANS National Security State Agency in the Borisov Government and as a Minister of Interior in the Oresharski Government. He was also chief of cabinet of former president Rosen Plevneliev.

Yovchev holds a Master's in economics from Sofia University. He is married and has one child. Yovchev speaks Russian and English in addition to his native Bulgarian.

References

1964 births
Living people
People from Pleven
Government ministers of Bulgaria
Sofia University alumni